This is a list of notable people from Catalonia.

Artists

 Ferrer Bassa (1285–1348), Catalan Gothic master and miniaturist
 Arnau Bassa (????–1348), altarpiece master and son of the previous
 Jacint Rigau i Ros (1659–1743), portrait artist
 Josep Tapiró i Baró (1836–1913), watercolour painter and fundamental member of Orientalism
 Marià Fortuny i Marsal (1838–1874), painter
 Josep Masriera (1841–1912), painter, goldsmith, and businessman
 Étienne Terrus (1857–1922), painter considered one of the precursors of fauvisme
 Eliseu Meifrèn (1857–1940), impressionist painter
 Aristide Maillol (1861–1944), sculptor and painter
 Santiago Rusiñol (1861–1931), painter, poet and playwright
 Ramon Casas i Carbó (1866–1932), artist and painter
 Ramon Pichot (1871–1925), painter
 Joaquin Mir Trinxet (1873–1940), painter
 Josefa Texidor i Torres (1875–1914), painter
 Juli González i Pellicer (1876–1942), sculptor and painter
 Josep Clarà (1878–1958), sculptor
 Pau Gargallo i Catalán (1881–1934), sculptor and painter
 Adelaida Ferré Gomis (1881-1955), lace-maker, folklorist, and teacher
 Joan Miró (1893–1983), surrealist artist 
 Lola Anglada (1893–1984), illustrator and writer
 Charlie Rivel (1896–1983), clown
 Àngel Planells (1901–1989), surrealist painter

 Salvador Dalí (1904–1989), surrealist artist
 Ceferí Olivé i Cabré (1907–1995), painter
 Remedios Varo (1908–1963), surrealist painter
 Angeles Santos Torroella (1911–2013), surrealist painter
 Antoni Clavé (1913–2005), painter, printmaker, sculptor, stage designer and costume designer
 Joan-Josep Tharrats (1918–2001), abstract artist and member of 
 Joan Brossa (1919–1998), poet, playwright, graphic designer and visual artist
 Joan Colom (1921–2017), photographer
 Manuel Carnicer i Fajó (1922–1998), hyperrealist colour pencils artist
 Albert Ràfols-Casamada (1923–2009), artist
 Antoni Tàpies (1923–2012), surrealist painter and member of 
 Xavier Valls (1923–2006), painter
 Modest Cuixart (1925–2001), painter and member of 
 Marcel Martí (1925–2010), sculptor
 Joan Ponç (1927–1984), painter and member of 
 Josep Guinovart (1927–2007), abstract expressionist painter
 Josep Maria Subirachs (1927–2014), sculptor and painter
 Jordi Bonet (1932–1979), painter, ceramist, muralist and sculptor
 Antoni Pitxot (1934–2015), surrealist painter
 Silvia Torras (1936–1970), informalist painter
 Xavier Miserachs (1937–1998), photographer
 Vicenç Caraltó (1939–1995), painter, draftsman and engraver
 Fina Rifà (born 1939), illustrator
 Isabel Steva i Hernández, "Colita" (born 1940), photographer
 Josep Royo (born 1945), contemporary artist
 Glòria Muñoz (born 1949), painter
 Anna Manel·la (1950–2019), sculptor
 Jaume Plensa (born 1955), sculptor
 Pere Jaume Borrell i Guinart, "Perejaume" (born 1957), contemporary artist
 Enric Bug (born 1957), comic book artist and industrial designer 
 Carlos Grangel (born 1963), character designer
 Neil Harbisson (born 1982), artist, founder of the Cyborg Foundation
 Moon Ribas (born 1985) choreographer, dancer, cyborg activist, founder of the Cyborg Foundation

Architects and Urban Planners

 Ildefons Cerdà i Sunyer (1815–1876), urban planner who designed the 19th-century "extension" of Barcelona called the Eixample
 Lluís Domènech i Montaner (1850–1927), modernist architect and politician, designed the Palau de la Música Catalana
 Antoni Gaudí (1852–1926), modernist architect, designed the Catholic church of the Sagrada Família in Barcelona
 Josep Puig i Cadafalch (1867–1956), architect, designed the urban gothic palace Casa Amatller
 Cebrià de Montoliu i de Togores (1873–1923), town planner, architect, and social reformer
 Josep Maria Jujol i Gibert (1879–1949), architect and designer; worked with Antoni Gaudí on many of his most famous works 
 Isidre Puig i Boada (1891–1987), architect
 Carles Buïgas i Sans (1898–1979), architect, engineer, inventor and author; designed the Magic Fountain in Montjuïc, Barcelona
 Josep Lluís Sert i López (1902–1983), architect, co-founder of the GATCPAC group, professor at Harvard

 Josep Antoni Coderch (1913–1984), architect recognized as one of the most important post-World War II European architects
 Antoni Bonet i Castellana (1913–1989), architect and urban planner
 Alfons Milà i Sagnier (1924–2009), architect
 Frederic de Correa i Ruiz (1924–2020), architect
 Oriol Bohigas i Guardiola (1925–2021), architect and urban planner
 Lluís Nadal i Oller (born 1929), architect
 Josep Emili Donato i Folch (born 1934), architect
 Lluís Cantallops Valeri (born 1934), architect
 Joan Margarit (1938–2021), architect
 Ricardo Bofill i Leví (1939–2022), architect
 Carme Pigem Barceló (born 1962), architect and member of the Pritzker Prize-winning architectural firm RCR Arquitectes
 Xavier Vilalta (born 1980), architect

Businesspeople
 Facundo Bacardí (1814–1886), founder of Bacardi rum
 Joseph Oller (1839–1922), founder of Moulin Rouge cabaret
 Andrés Brugal Montaner (1850–1914), founder of Brugal & Co. rum
 Enric Bernat (1923–2003), founder of Chupa Chups candy
 Eusebi Güell (1846–1918), industrial entrepreneur and patronage
 John Casablancas (1942–2013), founder of Elite Model Management (American from Catalan parents)

Cinema and Theater

 Fructuós Gelabert (1874–1955), inventor, screenwriter, film director
 Asunción Balaguer (1925–2019), actress
 Rosa Maria Sardà (born 1941), actress and comedian
 Albert Boadella (born 1943), playwright, director, actor, political activist, and founder of Els Joglars 
 Ventura Pons (born 1945), film director
 Bigas Luna (1946–2013), award-winning filmmaker
 Vicky Peña (born 1954), actress
 Assumpta Serna (born 1957), actress
 Francesc Orella (born 1957), actor
 Emma Vilarasau (born 1959), actress
 Isabel Coixet (born 1960), film director
 Eduard Fernandez (born 1964), actor
 Jordi Sánchez (born 1964), actor, comedian, well-known thanks to his leading roles in the popular sitcoms, Plats Bruts and La que se Avecina
 Sergi López (born 1965), actor, César's best actor winner in 2000
 Andreu Buenafuente (born 1965), comedian, television host and founder of the television production company, El Terrat
 Lydia Zimmermann (born 1966), filmmaker
 Jaume Balagueró (born 1968), film director behind REC zombie horror films
 Jordi Mollà (born 1968), actor, appeared in the Hollywood blockbusters Colombiana (2012) and Riddick (2013)
 Ariadna Gil (born 1969), actress
 Joel Joan (born 1970), actor, comedian, lead actor in the popular sitcom, Plats Bruts, filmmaker, founder of the television production company Kràmpack and former president of the Academy of Catalan Cinema
 Silvia Abril (born 1971), actress, comedian and television host
 David Selvas (born 1971), actor

 Laia Costa (born 1985), actress
 Laia Marull (born 1973), actress
 Jaume Collet-Serra (born 1974), filmmaker known for directing the horror remake House of Wax (2005), The Shallows (2016) and the memorable action-thrillers Unknown (2011), Non-Stop (2014), Run All Night (2015) and The Commuter (2018)
 Ingrid Rubio (born 1975), actress
 Daniel Brühl (born 1978), actor, born in Barcelona and raised in Germany
 Claudia Bassols (born 1979), actress
 Leticia Dolera (born 1981), actress
 Quim Gutiérrez (born 1981), actor
 Àstrid Bergès-Frisbey (born 1986), actress, appeared in the Hollywood blockbusters Pirates of the Caribbean: On Stranger Tides (2011) and King Arthur: Legend of the Sword (2017)
 Carlos Cuevas (born 1995), actor
 David Solans (born 1996), actor

Economists
 Andreu Mas-Colell (born 1944), economist
 Xavier Sala i Martin (born 1962), economist
 Pol Antràs, economist

Writers and poets

 Ramon Llull (c. 1232–c. 1315), philosopher, theologist, mystic, missionary, narrator, poet, logician and professor
 Ramon Muntaner (c. 1270–1336), soldier and writer of the 14th century
 Joanot Martorell (c. 1410–1465), knight and writer of the 15th century
 Jaime Balmes (1810–1848), priest, philosopher and political writer
 Àngel Guimerà, (1845–1924), writer
 Jacint Verdaguer (1845–1902), poet
 Narcís Oller (1846–1930), writer
 Joan Maragall (1860–1911), writer and poet
 Josep Carner (1884–1970), poet
 Gaziel (1887–1964), journalist, writer and publisher
 Carles Riba (1893–1959), poet
 Josep Vicenç Foix (1893–1987), poet, essayist and writer
 Josep Pla (1897–1981), writer
 Joan Oliver i Sallarès (1899–1986), pseudonym Pere Quart, poet, playwright, translator, narrator, and journalist

 Mercè Rodoreda (1909–1983), writer, known for novel The Time of the Doves (1962)
 Miquel Martí i Pol (1929–2003), writer and poet
 Pere Calders (1912–1994), writer
 Josep Ferrater i Mora (1912–1991), philosopher, essayist and writer
 Joan Sales (1912–1983), writer, poet, translator and editor
 Salvador Espriu (1913–1985), writer and poet
 Joan Vinyoli (1914–1984), poet
 Manuel de Pedrolo (1918–1990), writer 
 Montserrat Abelló i Soler (1918–2014), poet and translator
 Joan Brossa (1919–1998), poet, playwright, plastic artist and graphic designer
 Gabriel Ferrater (1922–1972), poet, translator and scholar of linguistics

 Maria Àngels Anglada (1930–1999), poet and novelist
 Quima Jaume i Carbo (1934–1993), poet
 Olga Xirinacs Díaz (born 1936), writer and pianist
 Montserrat Roig (1946–1991), writer, journalist, feminist
 Quim Monzó (born 1952), writer
 Maria Mercè Marçal (1952–1998), poet, writer and translator
 Sergi Pàmies (born 1960), writer, translator, journalist
 Joan Carreras i Goicoechea (born 1962), journalist, screenwriter and writer
 Màrius Serra (born 1963), writer, journalist, translator
 Albert Sánchez Piñol (born 1968), writer, novelist and author of the international best-seller Victus: Barcelona 1714
 Carla Herrero (born 1994), writer, blogger

Military

 Abu-l-Hasan Ali ibn Ruburtayr (? – 1187), Muslim Catalan mercenary commander
 Nunó Sanç I (c. 1185–1241), Catalan nobleman and military leader
 Berenguer de Palou II (died 1241), bishop of Barcelona and led different crusades
 Ramon Muntaner (1270–1336), commander and chronicler of the Catalan Company
 Francesc de Tamarit i de Rifà (1600–1653), military leader during the Battle of Montjuïc (1641)
 Rafael Casanova i Comes (1660–1743), Coronela leader during the Siege of Barcelona (1713–14)
 Josep Moragues i Mas (1669–1715), Catalan general during the War of Spanish Succession
 Manuel d'Amat i de Junyent (1707– 1782), military officer and colonial administrator
 Gaspar de Portolà (1716–1786), Spanish officer and explorer, first Governor of the Californias
 Pere Fages i Beleta (1734–1794), Spanish explorer, fifth Governor of the Californias
 Francisco Milans del Bosch (1769–1834), Spanish general.
 Llarg de Copons (1800–1839), Carlist warlord
 Ramón Cabrera y Griñó (1806–1877), Carlist general from Tortosa
 Joan Prim i Prats (1814 – 30 December 1870), Spanish general and statesman
 Josep Masgoret i Marcó (1820–1883), Carlist warlord
 Joseph Joffre (1852–1931), French general, born in Ribesaltes (Roussillon)
 Domènec Batet (1872–1937), Spanish Army general
 Ramon Vila Capdevila (1908–1963), anarchist and guerilla fighter
 Ramon Mercader (1913–1978), soviet spy, murderer of Leon Trotsky
 Sabaté brothers (fl. 1940s), three Maquis guerrillas of the Francoist post-Civil War period

Musicians and Singers

 Guerau de Cabrera (1160–1161), troubadour
 Jofre de Foixà (died 1300), troubadour, Benedictine and abbot of San Giovanni degli Eremiti in Palermo
 Ferran Sor (1778–1839), composer 
 Felip Pedrell (1841–1922), composer, guitarist and musicologist
 Isaac Albéniz (1860–1909), pianist and composer
 Enric Morera i Viura (1865–1942), musician and composer
 Enric Granados (1867–1916), musician
 Pau Casals (1876–1973), cellist 
 Miguel Llobet (1878–1938), composer and guitarist
 Maria Gay (1879–1943), mezzo-soprano
 Frederic Mompou (1893–1987), composer
 Conchita Supervía (1895–1936), soprano
 Robert Gerhard (1896–1970), composer
 Xavier Cugat (1900–1990), musician
 Joan Magrané Figuera, composer
 Xavier Montsalvatge (1912–2002), composer and music critic
 Victòria dels Àngels (1923–2005), soprano
 Alicia de Larrocha (1923–2009), pianist
 Tete Montoliu (1933–1997), jazz pianist

 Montserrat Caballé (1933–2018), soprano 
 Jaume Aragall (born 1939), tenor
Laura Almerich (1940–2019), classical guitarist
 Jordi Savall (born 1941), musician 
 Joan Manuel Serrat (born 1943), singer and author
 Josep Carreras (born 1946), tenor 
 Lluís Llach (born 1948), singer and composer
 Pau Riba (born 1948), singer and composer
 Jaume Sisa (born 1948), singer-songwriter
 Pascal Comelade (born 1955), musician
 Carles Sabater (born 1962), singer and actor
 Adrià Puntí (born 1963), musician and singer-songwriter
 Sergio Dalma (born 1963), singer
 Gerard Quintana (born 1964), singer
 Mónica Naranjo (born 1974), singer
 Guillermo Scott Herren (born 1976), producer
 Beth (born 1981), singer
 Sílvia Pérez Cruz (born 1983), singer, musician
 Álvaro Soler (born 1991), singer-songwriter
 Rosalía (born 1993), singer-songwriter, musician
 Aitana (born 1999), singer

Fashion

Fashion Designers
 Custo Dalmau (born 1959), fashion designer, founder of Custo Barcelona

Fashion Models
 Judit Mascó (born 1969)
 Vanessa Lorenzo (born 1977)
 Andrés Segura (born 1978)
 Oriol Elcacho (born 1979)
 Mireia Lalaguna (born 1992), Miss Universe 2015 winner
 Andres Velencoso  (born 1978)

Politicians and Leaders

Before the 19th Century
 Belló I of Carcassonne (755–810), founder of the Bellonid Dynasty known as the cradle of the Catalan lords and people
 Wilfred I the Hairy (died 897), 12th count of Barcelona, founder of the House of Barcelona
 Jaume I the Conqueror (1208–1276), 8th king of Aragon and 26th count of Barcelona
 Pere III the Great (1239–1285), 9th king of Aragon and 27th count of Barcelona
 Martí I the Humane (1356–1410), 15th king of Aragon and last monarch of the House of Barcelona
 Martí I the Younger (1374/1376–1409), king of Sicily dead at 32–35 in Cagliari
 Bernat d'Oms i Santa Pau (????–1474), governor of Elna, killed and beheaded by the troops of Louis XI
 Pau Claris i Casademunt (1586–1641), lawyer, 94th President of the Generalitat de Catalunya and leader at the Catalan Revolt (1635-1659)
 Rafael Casanova i Comes (1660–1743), lawyer and Conseller en Cap of the Consell de Cent of Barcelona
 Josep Moragues i Mas (1669–1715), Catalan patriot, led the insurgence against the Bourbonic troops after the War of the Spanish Succession until he was executed, decapitated, butchered and his head placed for 12 years hanging in the main entrance to Barcelona
 Gaspar de Portolà i Rovira (1716–1784), soldier, governor of Baja California and Alta California, explorer and founder of San Diego and Monterey
 Pere Fages i Beleta (1734–1794), soldier, explorer; second Spanish military Governor of New California, 1770–1774; Governor of the Californias, 1782-1791

Modern Politicians

 Joan Prim i Prats (1814–1870), general and statesman, Captain-General of Puerto Rico, commander of the Spanish Army in Mexico and in Morocco, and president of the Spanish Council
 Estanislao Figueras (1819–1882), first president of the First Spanish Republic
 Francesc Pi i Margall (1824–1901), second president of the First Spanish Republic
 Valentí Almirall (1841–1904), politician, author of Lo catalanisme, founder of the first daily periodical in the Catalan language, El diari català
 Francesc Macià, (1859–1933), soldier, politician and 122nd President of the Generalitat de Catalunya
 Josep Irla (1874–1958), politician, 124th President of the Generalitat de Catalunya
 Francesc Cambó (1876–1947), politician
 Enric Prat de la Riba (1879–1917), politician
 Lluís Companys (1882–1940), politician, 123rd President of the Generalitat de Catalunya
 Andreu Nin (1892–1937), heterodox communist politician
 Federica Montseny (1905–1994), anarchist politician
 José Figueres Ferrer (1906–1990), politician, President of Costa Rica in three occasions
 Jordi Pujol (born 1930), politician, 126th President of the Generalitat de Catalunya
 Pasqual Maragall (born 1941), politician, 127th President of the Generalitat de Catalunya
 Jaime Nebot (born 1946), politician, current Mayor of Guayaquil, Ecuador
 Josep Borrell (born 1947), former President of the European Parliament
 Artur Mas (born 1956), politician and 129th President of the Generalitat de Catalunya
 Carles Puigdemont i Casamajó, politician, 130th President of the Generalitat de Catalunya
 Amadeu Altafaj (born 1968), journalist and present European Commission Vice President spokesman
 Roger Albinyana i Saigí, Liberal politician
 Salvador Illa, former Minister of Health of Spain, current Secretary for Organization of the Socialists' Party of Catalonia 
 Meritxell Batet, currently serving as President of the Congress of Deputies
 Jaume Collboni, he is Deputy Mayor of Barcelona

Sportspeople

Alpinism, Trail Running and Ski

 Núria Picas (born 1976), sky runner and trail runner
 Kílian Jornet Burgada (born 1987), long-distance runner and ski mountaineer
 Jordi Font (born 1975), snowboarder
 Laura Orgué (born 1986), cross country skier

Athletics
 Reyes Estévez (born 1976), former 1500m runner
 Javier García (born 1966), former Pole Vaulter, Olympic bronze medallist
 Natalia Rodríguez (born 1979), 1500m runner

Basketball

 Ignacio "Nacho" Solozabal (born 1958), former player for Barça
 Jordi Villacampa (born 1963), former player and president from Joventut Badalona
 Rafael Jofresa (born 1966), former player from Joventut Badalona, Barça and CB Girona
 Roger Grimau (born 1978), former player from Joventut Badalona
 Pau Gasol (born 1980), ACB basketball player, formerly for Barça and currently in the NBA for the San Antonio Spurs
 Raúl López (born 1980), formerly for Joventut Badalona, NBA basketball player for Utah Jazz
 Juan Carlos Navarro (born 1980), NBA basketball player for Memphis Grizzlies and ACB for Barça
 Marc Gasol (born 1985), ACB basketball player for Barça and CB Girona and NBA for the Memphis Grizzlies; younger brother of Pau Gasol
 Pau Ribas (born 1987), former player from Joventut Badalona, currently as playmaker for Barça
 Ricky Rubio (born 1990), former player from Joventut Badalona; now with the Utah Jazz in the NBA
 Pierre Oriola (born 1992), Spanish National Team Player currently playing for Barça 
 Álex Mumbrú (born 1979), former Real Madrid and Spanish National Team Player, current captain of Bilbao Basket 
 Xavi Pascual (born 1972), former Barça coach, winner of 2010 Euroleague and current coach of Panathinaikos

Cycling
 David de la Cruz (born 1989), active
 Melcior Mauri (born 1966), Vuelta a España winner (1991)
 Maribel Moreno (born 1981)
 José Pesarrodona (born 1946), Vuelta a España winner (1976)
 Miguel Poblet (1928–2013)
 Joaquim Rodríguez (born 1979)
 Marc Soler (born 1993), active

Football

 Jordi Alba (born 1989), Spanish international, 2012 European Championship winner
 Marc Bartra (born 1991), Spanish international
 Estanislau Basora (born 1926), former Spanish international
 Sergio Busquets (born 1988), Spanish international, 2010 World Cup winner & 2012 European Championship winner
 Joan Capdevila (born 1978), former Spanish international, 2010 World Cup winner & 2008 European Championship winner
 Gerard Deulofeu (born 1994), Spanish international
 Cesc Fàbregas (born 1987), Spanish international, 2010 World Cup winner, 2008 & 2012 European Championship winner
 Andreu Fontàs (born 1989), Spanish international
 Sergio García (born 1983), Spanish international, 2008 European Championship winner
 Pep Guardiola (born 1971), former Spanish international, former manager of Barcelona and Bayern Munich and currently of Manchester City
 Roberto Martínez (born 1973), former manager of Everton and currently of Belgium
 Fernando Navarro (born 1982), former Spanish international, 2008 European Championship winner
 Gerard Piqué (born 1987), Spanish international, 2010 World Cup winner & 2012 European Championship winner
 Carles Puyol (born 1978), former Spanish international, 2010 World Cup winner & 2008 European Championship winner
 Antoni Ramallets (1924–2013), former Spanish international
 Carles Rexach (born 1947), former Spanish international, former manager of Barcelona
 Sergi Roberto (born 1992), Spanish international
 Josep Samitier (1902–1972), former Spanish international
 Raúl Tamudo (born 1977), former Spanish international
 Víctor Valdés (born 1982), former Spanish international, 2010 World Cup winner & 2012 European Championship winner
 Tito Vilanova (1969–2014), former manager of Barcelona
 Xavi Hernández (born 1980), former Spanish international, 2010 World Cup winner, 2008 & 2012 European Championship winner
 Ricardo Zamora (1901–1978), former Spanish international
 Sercan Sararer
 Alexia Putellas (born 1994), two time Ballon d'or winner and Barcelona captain

Motor Racing

 Alfonso "Sito" Pons (born 1959), former world champion GP motorcycle racer, owner of MotoGP race team
 Jordi Tarrés (born 1966), motorcycle trial rider, 7 times World Champion
 Àlex Crivillé (born 1970), former GP motorcycle racer, 1999 500cc GP World Champion
 Pedro Martínez de la Rosa (born 1971), former F1 driver
 Nani Roma (born 1972), rally racing motorcycle rider and rally raid driver, winner of 2004 and 2014 Dakar Rally
 Sete Gibernau (born 1972), former GP motorcycle racer
 Emilio Alzamora (born 1973), former motorcycle racer, 1999 125cc GP World Champion
 Marc Gené (born 1974), former F1 driver
 Oriol Servià (born 1974), former ChampCar, IndyCar, and Formula E driver, 1999 Indy Lights champion
 Marc Coma (born 1976), rally raid motorcycle racer, winner of 2006, 2009, 2011 and 2014 Dakar Rally
 Adam Raga (born 1982), motorcycle trial rider, Outdoor Trial World Champion 2005, 2006; Indoor Trial World Champion 2003, 2004, 2005 and 2006
 Toni Elías (born 1983), first world champion of "Moto2"
 Laia Sanz (born 1985), motorcycle trial rider and rally raid motorcycle racer; 13 times Women's Outdoor Trial World Champion; winner of the 2011 and 2012 Dakar Rally in the female class
 Dani Pedrosa (born 1985), GP motorcycle racer, 125 and 250cc world champion
 Toni Bou (born 1986), motorcycle trial rider; 8 time Indoor Trial World Champion; 7 time Outdoor Trial World Champion
 Jaime Alguersuari (born 1990), former F1 driver
 Marc Márquez (born 1993), motorcycle racer; 2010 125cc GP World Champion; 2012 Moto2 World Champion; 2013, 2014, 2016, 2017, 2018 and 2019 MotoGP World Champion

Swimming

 Eduard Admetlla i Lázaro (1924–2019), scuba diver pioneer who set the record of reaching 100m deep in 1957
 Manuel Estiarte (born 1961), former water polo player
 Gemma Mengual (born 1977), synchronised swimmer
 Mireia Belmonte (born 1990), medley, freestyle and butterfly swimmer, first woman ever under 8 min in 800m freestyle

Tennis
 Arantxa Sánchez Vicario (born 1971), 3-time French Open winner (1989, 1994 & 1998), US Open winner (1994)
 Juan Aguilera (born 1962)
 Sergi Bruguera (born 1971), 2-time French Open winner (1993 & 1994)
 Àlex Corretja (born 1974)
 Albert Costa (born 1975), French Open winner (2002)
 Carlos Costa (born 1968)
 Andrés Gimeno (1937-2019), French Open winner (1972)
 Juan Gisbert (born 1942)
 Marcel Granollers (born 1986), active
 Marc López (born 1982), active
 Félix Mantilla (born 1974)
 Tommy Robredo (born 1982), active

Other
 Carlos Rodríguez (born 1979), former professional darts player
 Juan Antonio Samaranch (1920–2010), president of the IOC from 1980 to 2001
 Dani Sánchez (born 1974), professional carom billiards player

Scientists and engineers

 François Arago (1786–1853), scientist
 Ildefons Cerdà (1815–1876), urban planner
 Narcís Monturiol (1819–1885), inventor of the first combustion-driven submarine
 Josep Comas i Solà (1868–1937), astronomer, discoverer of the asteroid named 'Barcelona'
 Ignacio Barraquer (Barcelona 1884–1965), ophthalmologist known for his contributions to the advancement of cataract surgery. Son of Josep Antoni Barraquer
 Esteban Terradas i Illa (1883–1950), mathematician, scientist and engineer
 Pere Bosch-Gimpera (1891–1974), anthropologist, archaeologist and prehistorian
 Josep Trueta (1897–1977), doctor, professor of orthopedy at Oxford
 Jose Barraquer (1916–1998), father of modern refractive surgery and son of Ignacio Barraquer; invented the cryolathe and microkeratome and developed many surgical procedures

 Ramon Margalef (1919–2004), pioneer and outstanding researcher in limnology, marine biology, and ecology
 Jordi Sabater Pi (1922–2009), primatologist
 Joan Oró (1923–2004), biologist
 Pere Alberch (1923–2004), biologist and embryologist, professor at Harvard University from 1980 to 1989 and director of the Museo Nacional de Ciencias Naturales, Madrid.
 Valentín Fuster (born 1943), Doctor of Medicine, director of the Cardiology Institute in Mount Sinai Hospital, New York
 Eudald Carbonell (born 1953), archaeologist, anthropologist and paleonthologist
 Joan Massagué (born 1953), scientist and pharmacist, specialized in the study of cancer metastasis
 Josep Baselga (born 1959), oncologist
 Josep Figueras (born 1959), health policy expert and founding director of the European Observatory on Health Systems and Policies
 Ignacio Cirac (born 1965), physicist, best known for his contributions to quantum information science
 Manel Esteller (born 1968), doctor, specialized in the study of cancer

Gastronomy

 Carme Ruscalleda (born 1952), chef of Sant Pau
 Santi Santamaria (1957–2011), chef of Can Fabes
 Ferran Adrià (born 1962), chef of El Bulli
 Joan Roca i Fontané (born 1964), chef of El Celler de Can Roca
 Josep Roca i Fontané (born 1966), sommelier of El Celler de Can Roca
 Jordi Roca i Fontané (born 1978), pastry chef of El Celler de Can Roca

Saints and religious figures
 Raymond of Penyafort (1175–1275), Roman Catholic saint and Dominican
 Vicent Ferrer (1350–1419), Valencian Dominican friar, who gained acclaim as a missionary and a logician.
 Pope Callixtus III, Alfons de Borja (1378–1458), Valencian pope 
 Pope Alexander VI, Roderic de Borja (1431–1503), Valencian pope
 Joseph Oriol (1650–1702)
 Juníper Serra (1713–1784), Roman Catholic saint and Franciscan missionary
 Anthony Mary Claret (1807–1870), founder of the Missionary Sons of the Immaculate Heart of Mary
 Francisco Coll Guitart (1812–1875), Roman Catholic saint and Dominican; founder of the Dominican Sisters of the Annunciation of the Blessed Virgin
 Josep Sadoc Alemany (1814–1888), first Roman Catholic archbishop of San Francisco, California
 Vicente Ferrer Moncho (1920–2009), Jesuit missionary; humanitarian
 Jaime Hilario Barbal (1898–1937), Catalan priest and educator, canonized as a saint of the Roman Catholic Church in 1999.
 Cassià Maria Just (1926–2008), Benedictine abbot, one of the people in the Spanish Catholic Church who opposed Francisco Franco
 Lluís Martínez Sistach (born 1937), former Cardinal Archbishop of Barcelona (2004-2015); member of the Supreme Tribunal of the Apostolic Signatura

Others
 Nahmanides (1194–1270), Catalan-Jewish philosopher
 Pompeu Fabra (1868–1948), grammarian
 Rosa Sensat (1873–1961), early Doctor of Pedagogy
 Alexandre Deulofeu (1903–1977), historian
 Joan Gili (1907–1998), antiquarian book-seller, publisher and translator
 Juan Pujol García (alias Garbo) (1912–1988), double agent who played a major role in the Invasion of Normandy during World War II
 Rafael Marquina (1921–2013), designer and architect
 Jordi Nadal (1929–2020), historian
 Salvador Puig i Antich (1948–1974), Catalan anarchist, executed during Franco's regime
 Jaume Marxuach i Flaquer (1906–1966), lawyer and writer
 Joan Laporta i Estruch (born 1962), lawyer, president of FC Barcelona, and politician

See also
List of Andorrans
List of Balearics
List of Valencians
Lists of people by nationality
List of Spaniards
List of French people

References

 
Lists of Catalan people
Catalan
Catalan